Maurice O'Brien was an Irish hurler. His championship career at senior level with the Cork county team lasted just one season in 1919.

Born in Cork, O'Brien first played competitive hurling with the St Finbarr's club. During a successful period for the club, he won four county championship medals.

O'Brien was added to the Cork senior panel for the 1919 championship. It was a successful season for the team, with O'Brien winning his sole All-Ireland medal that year. He also won one Munster medal.

Honours
St Finbarr's
Cork Senior Hurling Championship (1): 1919, 1922, 1923 (c), 1926

Cork
All-Ireland Senior Hurling Championship (1): 1919
Munster Senior Hurling Championship (1): 1919

References

St Finbarr's hurlers
Cork inter-county hurlers
Year of birth missing
Year of death missing